Roald Amundsen (18 September 1913 – 29 March 1985) was a Norwegian football defender who was a member of the Norway team at the 1938 FIFA World Cup. Amundsen was a reserve member of the squad, and never actually played any full internationals for Norway. He was, however, capped twice as a "B" international.

At club level, Amundsen played for Mjøndalen, and was a member if the MIF side that won the Norwegian Cup in 1937.

References

External links

1913 births
1985 deaths
Norwegian footballers
Association football defenders
Mjøndalen IF players
1938 FIFA World Cup players